The club Llaneros de Guanare Escuela de Fútbol (usually called Llaneros) is a professional football club promoted to Primera División in 2011, based in Guanare, Portuguesa State.

Achievements
Segunda División Venezolana: 3
1996, 1999, 2011

Current first team squad

Managers
 Frank Piedrahita (July 1, 2009–July 1, 2011), (July 1, 2012–1?)
 Miguel Acosta (Sept 20, 2011–Dec 31, 2012)
 Rodrigo Piñon (201?–)

External links
Official Site

Association football clubs established in 1985
Llaneros
Sport in Portuguesa (state)
1985 establishments in Venezuela